The canton of Briançon-2 (before March 2015: Briançon-Nord) is an administrative division in southeastern France. It consists of the eastern part of the commune of Briançon (a larger part than in the former canton of Briançon-Nord) and its northeastern suburbs. It includes the following communes:
Briançon (partly)
Montgenèvre
Névache
Val-des-Prés

Demographics

See also
Cantons of the Hautes-Alpes department

References

Cantons of Hautes-Alpes